Rodger Arneil (born 1 May 1944) is a former Scotland international rugby union player. He was played on two British and Irish Lions tours - to South Africa in 1968 and New Zealand in 1971, the second tour as a replacement.

Rugby Union career

Amateur career

He played club rugby for both Edinburgh Academicals and Leicester Tigers.

Provincial career

Arneil captained the 1967 Edinburgh and District team.
He also captained the 1969 Durham County side.

International career

Scotland

R. F. U. Centenary Match 1970

Scotland beat England in both matches played at Murrayfield and Twickenham.

Scotland Touring
Arneil was a member of the 1969 Scotland team that toured Argentina. This tour and internationals were not classed as full, thus no caps were awarded. There were two ‘internationals’ played against an Argentine XV. Scotland lost the first and won the second.
				1st International	Arg 11 v Sco  3
				2nd International	Arg   3 v Sco  6
Arneil captained Scotland in the second match v Argentina which was won 6 v 3.

Arneil was a member of the 1970 Scotland team that toured Australia. The one test played on this tour was classed as a full test. Other matches were played on this tour. Scotland won the Test and the score was Australia 23 v Scotland 3.

				1 Test		Aus  23 v  Sco  3

British and Irish Lions

Rodger Arneil was a member of the 1968 touring team to South Africa and played in all 4 Tests. He was selected for the 1971 British Lions tour to New Zealand. Due to business commitments he joined the tour following the second test.

Barbarians

Arneil played 15 times for the Barbarians including the 1969 Barbarian tour to South Africa.
Scored first try Baa Baas vs South Africa 1970.

References

Sources

 Bath, Richard (ed.) The Scotland Rugby Miscellany (Vision Sports Publishing Ltd, 2007 )
 McLaren, Bill Talking of Rugby (1991, Stanley Paul, London )
 Massie, Allan A Portrait of Scottish Rugby (Polygon, Edinburgh)

1944 births
Living people
Scottish rugby union players
British & Irish Lions rugby union players from Scotland
Scotland international rugby union players
Rugby union players from Edinburgh
Edinburgh Academicals rugby union players
Leicester Tigers players
Edinburgh District (rugby union) players
Rugby union flankers